Jean Ferrier or Juan Ferrer (died 1550) was a Roman Catholic prelate who served as Archbishop of Arles (1521–1550).

Biography
On 23 Aug 1518, he was appointed during the papacy of Pope Leo X as Coadjutor Archbishop of Arles and succeeded to the archbishopric on 17 Jan 1521.
He served as Archbishop of Arles until his death in 1550.

References

External links and additional sources
 (for Chronology of Bishops) 
 (for Chronology of Bishops) 

16th-century Roman Catholic archbishops in France
Bishops appointed by Pope Leo X
1550 deaths